Carabus obsoletus carpathicus is a subspecies of beetle from family Carabidae, found in Czech Republic, Moldova, Romania, and Ukraine.

References

obsoletus carpathicus
Beetles described in 1825
Beetles of Europe